Sirpa Paatero (born 9 September 1964) is a Finnish politician of the Social Democratic Party (SDP) who has been serving as Minister of Local Government in the government of Prime Minister Sanna Marin since 2019.

Political career 
In parliament, Paatero served on the Commerce Committee (2006–2014), the Defence Committee (2007–2009, 2015–2019), the Sub-Committee on Employment and Economy Affairs (2011–2014) and the Sub-Committee on Taxes (2012–2014), among others.
 
Paatero served as the Minister for International Development in Prime Minister Alexander Stubb's cabinet (2014–2015) and again in Antti Rinne's cabinet in 2019. She offered her resignation from the Rinne cabinet in November 2019 after failing to act to prevent state-owned postal services from cutting the pay of around 700 workers. 

Paatero is also the chairman of the Finnish Workers' Sports Federation.

References

1964 births
Living people
People from Kotka
Social Democratic Party of Finland politicians
Government ministers of Finland
Members of the Parliament of Finland (2003–07)
Members of the Parliament of Finland (2007–11)
Members of the Parliament of Finland (2011–15)
Members of the Parliament of Finland (2015–19)
Members of the Parliament of Finland (2019–23)
Women government ministers of Finland
21st-century Finnish women politicians
Women members of the Parliament of Finland